The Greater New Orleans Expressway Commission (GNOEC), commonly called The Causeway Commission, is an entity responsible for the maintenance, construction, and enforcement of safety laws on the Lake Pontchartrain Causeway. It is headquartered in Metairie, a suburb of New Orleans.

The Causeway Commission consists of five commissioners from Jefferson and St. Tammany parishes.

See also
Greater New Orleans

References

External links
Lake Pontchartrain Causeway Bridge

Transportation in the New Orleans metropolitan area